My Father Was at Fault (Spanish: Mi papá tuvo la culpa) is a 1953 Mexican comedy film directed by José Díaz Morales and starring Meche Barba, Antonio Aguilar and Óscar Pulido.

Cast
 Meche Barba 
 Antonio Aguilar 
 Óscar Pulido 
 Famie Kaufman 
 Alfredo Varela 
 Carlota Solares 
 Otilia Larrañaga 
 Maty Huitrón 
 Ana Bertha Lepe 
 Víctor Alcocer 
 Humberto Rodríguez 
 María Alejandra

References

Bibliography 
 María Luisa Amador. Cartelera cinematográfica, 1950-1959. UNAM, 1985.

External links 
 

1953 films
1953 comedy films
Mexican comedy films
1950s Spanish-language films
Films directed by José Díaz Morales
Mexican black-and-white films
1950s Mexican films